The Roman Catholic Diocese of Espinal is a diocese located in the city of Espinal in the Ecclesiastical province of Ibagué in Colombia.

History
 18 March 1957: Established as Diocese of El Espinal from the Diocese of Ibagué

Bishops

Ordinaries
Jacinto Vásquez Ochoa (1956.12.22 – 1974.12.12)
Hernando Rojas Ramirez (1974.12.12 – 1985.07.01), appointed Bishop of Neiva
Alonso Arteaga Yepes (1985 – 1989.10.30) 
Abraham Escudero Montoya (1990.04.30 – 2007.02.02), appointed Bishop of Palmira
Pablo Emiro Salas Anteliz (2007.10.24 – 2014.08.18), appointed Bishop of Armenia
Orlando Roa Barbosa (2015.05.30 - 2020.05.29), appointed Archbishop of Ibagué
Miguel Fernando González Mariño (2020.12.19 - )

Coadjutor bishop
Hernando Rojas Ramirez (1972-1974)

Other priest of this diocese who became bishop
Juan Carlos Barreto Barreto, appointed Bishop of Quibdó in 2013

See also
Roman Catholicism in Colombia

Sources

External links
 Catholic Hierarchy
 GCatholic.org

Roman Catholic dioceses in Colombia
Roman Catholic Ecclesiastical Province of Ibagué
Christian organizations established in 1957
Roman Catholic dioceses and prelatures established in the 20th century